Marcel R. Tremblay (born 30 March 1943) is a former Progressive Conservative member of the House of Commons of Canada. Born in L'Ange-Gardien, Quebec, he was an accountant and business consultant by career.

He represented the Quebec riding of Quebec East where he was first elected in the 1984 federal election and re-elected in 1988, therefore becoming a member in the 33rd and 34th Canadian Parliaments.

Tremblay left federal politics after he was defeated in the 1993 federal election by Jean-Paul Marchand of the Bloc Québécois.

Marcel R. Tremblay graduated, in 1966, from Laval University in Quebec City with a bachelor's degree in Commerce (B.Sc.C.) and, in 1967, with a master's degree in Accounting (M.Sc.C.). Moreover, he had the privilege to supplement training courses at the University of La Sorbonne in Paris and that of Ljubljana in Yugoslavia.

In a 35 years’ career like professional and businessman, an engagement in politics was intercaled. Elected in 1984 and re-elected in 1988 as a member of Parliament with the progressive-conservative party, he worked actively as Parliamentary Secretary to the Deputy Prime Minister, to the Minister of Finances and to the Minister of Justice and Solicitor General of Canada.

Professional experience 
At the end of his studies at Laval University in 1967, Marcel R. Tremblay began his career as an advisor with Price Waterhouse in Montreal and then in Quebec City. Thereafter, he was member, cofounder and shareholder of Group Solaris, a company specialized in doors and windows. He continued his career in industry, initially as a director of finances and controller of the Industrial Research Center of Quebec. Thereafter, he became vice-president director-general of a manufacturing company.

In 1994, Marcel R. Tremblay founded and directed a commercial firm (trading house) specialized in the foreign trade, a company which he will have to leave to be dedicated in politics. After two mandates in the House of Commons in Ottawa, he turned over to the private sector and became owner of a firm specialized in Mergings and Acquisitions of companies in Montreal.

In order to be closer of his family, he returned to Quebec City and founded his own center of development of businesses, mergers and acquisitions of companies, strategic alliances and private financing, under the corporate name Le Groupe Marcel R. Tremblay Inc. Important successful achievements were realized for the benefit of his clients, purchasers and salesmen, particularly in the agricultural and mining sectors, in distribution, in wholesale as in the sectors of professional services and financing.

Through the years, Marcel R. Tremblay acted as an advisor to a number of governments in South America, in Europe and in Africa. Lastly, he advised the directors of the firm Trust Eterna, specialized in the development of businesses. He also acted as a senior special advisor to Capital STS and Hill Knowlton.

Parliamentary responsibilities 
During his two mandates in the House of Commons in Ottawa, Marcel R. Tremblay occupied several important functions of which those of Parliamentary Secretary of the Deputy Prime Minister, of the Minister of finances, of the Private Council President, of the Vice Leader of the Government, of the Minister of Justice, of the principal associate Whip. From 1984 to 1993, he was also President of the caucus of the deputies for the great area of Quebec.

He was a co-president of the Commission on the reform of the Senate and member of House of Commons Permanent Management Committee. Marcel R. Tremblay was also member of several parliamentary committees on the international scene: Canada-Europe, Canada-Japan, Canada-United States and Canada-China. He took part in several economic and political missions in Germany, in Brussels, in Moscow, in New Zealand, in the Netherlands and at Taiwan. Lastly, he was representing the Canadian government at the United Nations, at N.A.T.O. and at O.E.C.D.

Community engagement 
Mr. Tremblay sat during several years at the Executive Committee and on the Board of directors of the Quebec Metropolitan Chamber of Trade and Industry, in addition to sitting on several committees of the Chamber.

He participates actively at several social welfare organizations in Quebec City, in particular with La Société Grand Village where he acts as vice-president and at the Rotary Club of Quebec where he has been the president in 1997–1998. In 2003 and in 2010, he was awarded by the Rotary Foundation the title of «Paul Harris Fellow» in recognition of his generous assistance and support.

He sat on the Board of directors of Limoilou College; he was also the Secretary of the Quebec Heritage Foundation and of the Council of the Monuments and Sites of Quebec. He also was vice-president of Canada Day in the City of Quebec.  He was president of the Commission of the credit at the Caisse  populaire de Charlesbourg and sat on the Executive Committee ant on the Board of directors of the Security and Defence Technopole. He is actually the president of the Board of directors of the Iledor Corporation, member of the Board of directors of the Association des sociétés québécoises cotées en Bourse (ASQCB) and acts as Senior Advisor with Matica Enterprises Inc. (GRF) and with PELICAN MINING RESOURCES. Since September 2017, he is a member of the board of directors of The American Chamber of Commerce in Canada. He is also a honorary consult for the Côte d'Ivoire consulate in Québec. He is also the president of the Board of Directors of the École du Ballet de Québec.

Personal information 
Marcel R. Tremblay resides in the municipality of L’Ange-Gardien where he also exploits a farm. He is the father of two children: Lissia C.Tremblay is a lawyer and David R. Tremblay is a Bachelor in Consumption Sciences at Laval University.

References
 

1943 births
Living people
Members of the House of Commons of Canada from Quebec
Progressive Conservative Party of Canada MPs
French Quebecers